Dulari Qureshi (born 24 September 1950) is an Indian academic, art historian and author. She has written more than 1,000 articles on art, culture and tourism development and its impacts on monuments. She is a retired professor and Director in the Department of Tourism Administration, Dr. Babasaheb Ambedkar Marathwada University, Aurangabad. She is also the Cultural chairperson of the Ellora-Ajanta Aurangabad Festival. One of her significant contributions is the discovery of inscriptions at Pitalkhora near Aurangabad. Qureshi is the President of Indian Tourist Congress (Western Zone). She is from Aurangabad, Maharashtra.

Biography

Dulari Qureshi is the daughter of Professor Ramesh Shankar Gupte, an art historian, author and the former head of Department of History and a senior professor in Dr. Babasaheb Ambedkar Marathwada University in Aurangabad. Her mother Nalini Gupte was a physician.

She holds a Doctorate in Art History; the topic of her thesis being, 'Art and Vision of Aurangabad Caves'. She also has a degree in Journalism and a post graduate diploma in Tourism.

Work

Dulari Qureshi has made contributions in the fields of art, history and journalism. She has written more than 20 research articles which were published on national level in books and journals. Apart from her research work, she also contributes articles, feature stories, conducts interviews of famous personalities and has more than 500 articles and other stories to her credit. She started a series of articles and feature stories on the gates of Auranagabad, their present condition which received attention on national level. More so, to promote the local culture and tourism, Dr Dulari along with Dr Morwanchikar took efforts to start the Ellora-Aurangabad festival, of which she is the cultural chairperson, which is held annually.

History 

Apart from being a historian, Qureshi is also a History activist. She played a major role in coercing the ASI to plan and to carry out some rock-buttressing and waterproofing works in the Ajanta Caves along with the chemical conservation of a few of its frescoes. Qureshi along with Morwonchikar, and Walter Spink also pointed out the blunders made at Ajanta by conservators in the past. They opined that only those frescoes in immediate danger of crumbling should be attended to by the ASI or any other national or International body working for the conservation of Ajanta caves.

Associations

She is closely associated with a number of organisations which are as follows:

 The Tourism Advisory Board; Maharashtra
 Executive Member; Indian National Trust for Art and Cultural Heritage
 Expert Committee on Antiquities ASI
 Cultural Chairperson; Ellora Ajanta Aurangabad Festival Committee
 She was also Joint Secretary of the World Management Conference held in Aurangabad in October 1999
 Member of the Heritage Committee formed by the Aurangabad Municipal Corporation

Books written 

Art and Vision of Aurangabad Caves
Tourism Potential in Aurangabad
Fort of Daulatabad
Rock Cut Temples of Western India
Sculptures of Marathwada
Ajanta, Sculpture, Architecture and Painting
Encyclopedia of Hindu Temples (co-writer)
Encyclopedia of Buddhist Temples (co-writer)
Encyclopedia of Jain Temples (co-writer)
Encyclopedia of Muslim Monuments (co-writer)

Books edited 

 Encyclopedia on Hinduism, Buddhism, Jainism and Islam (IV Volumes)

References

Sources 
Vedic Books
Ellora-Aurangabad Festival Committee
Bagchee.com
Tribune India

Educators from Maharashtra
Women educators from Maharashtra
Indian Muslims
People from Aurangabad, Maharashtra
1950 births
People from Dhar
Living people
Indian women historians
20th-century Indian historians
Indian art historians
Historians of South Asia
Dr. Babasaheb Ambedkar Marathwada University
People from Marathwada
20th-century Indian women scientists
20th-century Indian scientists
20th-century Indian non-fiction writers
Historians of Indian art
20th-century Indian women writers
Women scientists from Maharashtra